William Ross Moore (born October 10, 1960) is a former Major League Baseball player.

External links

1960 births
Living people
American expatriate baseball players in Canada
Baseball players from Los Angeles
Calgary Expos players
Denver Zephyrs players
Indianapolis Indians players
Jacksonville Expos players
Jacksonville Suns players
Major League Baseball first basemen
Montreal Expos players
Oklahoma City 89ers players
Rochester Red Wings players
West Palm Beach Expos players
Anchorage Glacier Pilots players
Cal State Fullerton Titans baseball players
Alaska Goldpanners of Fairbanks players